Salaciopsis is a genus of shrubs and small trees in the family Celastraceae.  The genus is  endemic to New Caledonia in the Pacific and contains six species.

List of species
 Salaciopsis glomerata 
 Salaciopsis longistyla 
 Salaciopsis megaphylla 
 Salaciopsis neocaledonica 
 Salaciopsis sparsifolia 
 Salaciopsis tiwakae

References

Celastraceae
Celastrales genera
Endemic flora of New Caledonia